Andy Bischoff (born December 8, 1970) is an American football coach who is currently the tight ends coach for the New York Giants of the National Football League (NFL). He was previously the assistant tight ends coach for the Baltimore Ravens. Bischoff has also been a coach for the NFL's Chicago Bears, Houston Texans and the Montreal Alouettes of the Canadian Football League (CFL), where he was a part of two Grey Cup winning teams.

Coaching career 
After college, Bischoff opted to take a job as a teacher and high school football coach over enrolling in a minor league baseball umpire school, working at Cretin-Derham Hall High School in Minnesota. Beginning as the offensive line coach at Cretin-Derham in 1993, he finished his time at the school as the assistant head coach and offensive coordinator, as well as the dean of students. He left Cretin-Derham to be the running backs coach for the Montreal Alouettes of the CFL in 2008, where he won two Grey Cups.

Chicago Bears
He followed Alouettes head coach Marc Trestman in 2013, serving as his tight ends coach for the Chicago Bears, and was not retained after Trestman's firing following the 2014 season.

Baltimore Ravens
Bischoff was hired as an offensive assistant by the Baltimore Ravens in 2015. He was promoted to assistant tight ends coach in 2018.

Houston Texans
Bischoff went with David Culley to the Houston Texans in 2021 and was named the team’s tight ends coach.

New York Giants
On February 6, 2022, Bischoff was hired as the tight ends coach for the New York Giants.

References 

1970 births
Living people
Sportspeople from Fargo, North Dakota
Players of American football from North Dakota
Coaches of American football from North Dakota
American football centers
South Dakota Coyotes football players
High school football coaches in Minnesota
Montreal Alouettes coaches
Chicago Bears coaches
Baltimore Ravens coaches
Houston Texans coaches
New York Giants coaches